Edward Noonan may refer to:

Edward A. Noonan (1852–1927), mayor of St Louis, USA
Edward C. Noonan (born 1948), American politician
 Edward Thomas Noonan (1861–1923), American politician from Illinois
Edward Noonan (architect) (born 1930), Chicago architect and developer